State Highway 170 (SH 170) also known as the Alliance Gateway Freeway, is a Texas state highway in the northern suburbs of Fort Worth in the Alliance area. The highway was designated in 1988.

History
SH 170 was originally designated on August 3, 1932, as a connector route from the Oklahoma border west to US 60 and US 87 near Canadian. This route was redesignated as SH 33 on October 26, 1954 to coincide with OK 33, with which it connects. The current SH 170 was designated in 1988.

Construction of an interchange at SH 114 began in 2016.

Proposed tollway
The North Texas Tollway Authority planned to build tolled main lanes by 2015 and will extend the highway west to US 287/US 81, and, eventually, ultimately to extend it to the Jacksboro Highway (SH 199), but it didn't occur. 

TxDOT and the NTTA held a public hearing in Roanoke about the proposed toll road on February 26, 2015. The tollway is proposed to have six main lanes.

Major intersections

References

External links

170
Transportation in Tarrant County, Texas
Transportation in Denton County, Texas
Transportation in Fort Worth, Texas